The 1933 Sydney Carnival was the eighth edition of the Australian National Football Carnival, an Australian football interstate competition. The carnival was held in Sydney over an eleven-day period between Wednesday 2 August and Saturday 12 August.

During the competition, Queensland broke a 20-game carnival losing streak when they accounted for Canberra by 42 points. The Canberrans were competing in their inaugural Australian National Football Carnival.

New South Wales were the better of the weaker set of teams, defeating each of Tasmania, Canberra and Queensland. Once more, South Australian and Western Australia outfits were no match for Victoria.

During the carnival, Australian rules football officials entered a conference with New South Wales Rugby League officials with the view to developing a hybrid between the two sports, known as universal football. A trial match featuring members of the Queensland team was held in private on Friday 11 August, but nothing further came of the proposal.

Results

Notes

References
Full Points Footy: 1933 Sydney Carnival

Australian rules interstate football
Sydney Carnival, 1933
August 1933 sports events